Morten Asser Karsdal (born 2 September 1973) is a Danish molecular biologist and CEO of Nordic Bioscience, a Danish global drug development organization.

Early life 
He earned an M.Sc. in Cell and Molecular Biology from the Technical University of Denmark (DTU) in 1998. He received his Ph.D. in Bone and Cartilage Pharmacology from the University of Southern Denmark in 2004.

Career
Karsdal joined Nordic Bioscience in 2001 and became CEO in June 2010. He has written or co-written more than 500 peer-reviewed articles, achieving more than 21,000 citations and has given talks at scientific conferences around the world.

Karsdal is recognized for his expertise in biomarker development, including biomarkers that reflect connections between the extracellular matrix and disease biology. He has done extensive research in the field of rheumatology (rheumatoid arthritis and osteoarthritis), diabetes and fibrosis.

Karsdal spearheaded the development of FDA-approved molecular diagnostics and more than 70 commercialized ELISA assays. He has extensive experience with clinical trial design in combination with clinical use of biochemical markers. Karsdal acts as a consultant to major pharmaceutical companies for the use of serological biochemical markers in clinical trials. He is Honorary Professor in inflammation research at the University of Southern Denmark3, and continues to supervise postgraduate students. He wrote his first book: Biochemistry of Collagens, Laminins and Elastin in 2016, which provides a comprehensive introduction to collagen and structural proteins. He has several US patents.

References

Living people
1973 births
University of Southern Denmark alumni